Victoria Hudson (born 28 May 1996) is an Austrian athlete specialising in the javelin throw. She represented her country at the 2019 World Championships, but did not qualify for the final. She competed in the 2020 Olympics.

Her personal best in the event is 64.68 metres set in Eisenstadt on April 26, 2021.

She was born in Austria to an English father and Austrian mother.

International competitions

References

External links
 

1996 births
Living people
Austrian female javelin throwers
World Athletics Championships athletes for Austria
Austrian people of English descent
Competitors at the 2017 Summer Universiade
Competitors at the 2019 Summer Universiade
Athletes (track and field) at the 2020 Summer Olympics
Olympic athletes of Austria